is a railway station in the city of Fukuroi, Shizuoka Prefecture, Japan, operated by the Central Japan Railway Company (JR Tōkai ).

Lines

Station layout
Aino Station has a single island platform, connected by a footbridge on which the two-story station building is constructed. The station has a "Midori no Madoguchi" staffed ticket office.

Platforms

Adjacent stations

Station history
Aino Station was opened on 22 April 2001 in conjunction with the 2002 FIFA World Cup as the location closest to the Shizuoka "Ecopa" Stadium.

Station numbering was introduced to the section of the Tōkaidō Line operated JR Central in March 2018; Aino Station was assigned station number CA28.

Passenger statistics
In fiscal 2017, the station was used by an average of 3078 passengers daily (boarding passengers only).

Surrounding area
Shizuoka Institute of Science and Technology
Shizuoka Stadium

See also
 List of Railway Stations in Japan

References

Yoshikawa, Fumio. Tokaido-sen 130-nen no ayumi. Grand-Prix Publishing (2002) .

External links

Aino Station official home page.

Railway stations in Shizuoka Prefecture
Tōkaidō Main Line
Railway stations in Japan opened in 2001
Stations of Central Japan Railway Company
Fukuroi, Shizuoka